Discovery Zone (DZ) was an American chain of entertainment facilities featuring games and elaborate indoor mazes designed for young children, including roller slides, climbing play structures, and ball pits.  It also featured arcade games. A talking robot character named Z-Bop served as mascot to the chain.  Ronald Matsch, Jim Jorgensen and Dr. David Schoenstadt founded Discovery Zone in 1989, with the first location opening in Kansas City, Missouri, in October 1989. An early investor in and vocal supporter of the company was tennis player Billie Jean King.

Discovery Zone was also notable for being the first corporate sponsor of the PBS children’s program Sesame Street.

In 2020, a new center using the Discovery Zone name opened in the Cincinnati suburb of Union Township, Ohio; it is not affiliated with the original company, but is heavily inspired by it. A second location was added in Florence, Kentucky, at the Florence Mall on July 23, 2021.

History 

Founded in 1989, Discovery Zone grew quickly, opening 15 stores in 18 months. In April 1993, Blockbuster Video invested $10.3 million into Discovery Zone to purchase 21% of the company. In June 1993, Discovery Zone raised $55 million more when it went public on NASDAQ. The stock rose 61% in the first day of trading.

Discovery Zone completed a successful IPO in June 1993 (led by Chris Bellios, Sam Jeremenko and Steven Noe) raising over $50 million. In 1994, Discovery Zone merged its operations with Blockbuster Video and its (now former) parent Viacom. Sumner Redstone managed to shift the assets to Blockbuster and move operations to Chicago. He told numerous college students at the 1995 annual meeting how "solid" an investment this would be. Discovery Zone filed for bankruptcy shortly after.

Under the leadership of then CEO Don Flynn, in July 1994, Discovery Zone bought 45 Leaps and Bounds stores from McDonald's for $111 million in stock and 57 franchised stores from Blockbuster Video for $91 million in stock bringing the total stores to almost 300. At the same time, Blockbuster bought more shares of Discovery Zone giving it 50.1% of the stock.

Blockbuster Video, then a subsidiary of Viacom, took total management control of Discovery Zone in April 1995. Viacom had plans to cross market Discovery Zone with its other businesses, such as Nickelodeon, Paramount Pictures, and Showtime. By the time Viacom took control of Discovery Zone, the company signed a deal with Saban Entertainment to include characters from the Mighty Morphin Power Rangers television series at the play centers. Discovery Zone had also planned a new family entertainment center to compete against Dave & Buster’s, which was dubbed “Metro Zone”. The new complexes would have included dining, drinking, mini golf and VR games in addition to the indoor playground equipment that Discovery Zone is known for.

Stretched thin by expansion, changes in management tried to save the company; however, Discovery Zone filed for Chapter 11 bankruptcy protection on March 26, 1996, in Wilmington, Delaware, with debts of up to $366.8 million.

In April 1999 Discovery Zone re-entered bankruptcy. This time with the abrupt closure half of their locations on June 30, that same year and being unable to alert those with reserved parties. Thirteen locations were sold to CEC Entertainment, Inc., owner of Chuck E. Cheese, who attempted to accommodate last minute party reschedulings over the following days.

In June 2000, Discovery Zone's bankruptcy court judge ruled that there was no feasible way for the brand to be profitable. And their bankruptcy was converted into liquidation. 

By the end of 2001, the remaining 205 locations (in 39 states, Canada, and Puerto Rico) shut down and Discovery Zone went out of business completely.

Slogans

 "It's Fun-believable Fitness For Kids"
 "DZ it's Discovery Zone, Where Kids Can Be Kids On Their Own" (TV commercials)
 "Zoned In"
 "I'm Goin' DZ" / "Where Kids Wanna Be"
 "You're Either In The Zone, Or You're Not"
 "Exercise Your Right"
 "Are You Ready For The New DZ?"
 "Never The Same Fun Twice"
 "DZ! Where kids wanna be!"

References

External links
BusinessWeek profile (archived)
Discovery Zone website

Entertainment companies established in 1989
Entertainment companies disestablished in 2001
Restaurants established in 1989
Restaurants disestablished in 2001
Companies that filed for Chapter 11 bankruptcy in 1996
Companies that filed for Chapter 11 bankruptcy in 1999
Companies that have filed for Chapter 7 bankruptcy
Defunct companies based in New York (state)
1990 establishments in Kansas
Blockbuster LLC
Former Viacom subsidiaries
Defunct retail companies of the United States
Defunct restaurants in the United States